The Sultan of Johor is a hereditary seat and the sovereign ruler of the Malaysian state of Johor. In the past, the sultan held absolute power over the state and was advised by a bendahara. Currently, the role of bendahara has been taken over by first minister (Malay: Menteri Besar) with the constitutional monarchy system via Johor State Constitution. The Sultan is the constitutional head of state of Johor. The Sultan has his own independent military force, the Royal Johor Military Force (Malay: Askar Timbalan Setia Negeri Johor). The Sultan is also the Head of Islam in Johor state.

History 
The first sultan of Johor was Alauddin Riayat Shah II. He was the son of the last sultan of Malacca, Sultan Mahmud Shah. The descendants of the Sultanate of Malacca in Johor ended with the death of Sultan Mahmud Shah II in 1699 and throne was taken over by Sultan Abdul Jalil IV, marking the rule of the House of Bendahara. Abdul Jalil IV was a bendahara before the death of the sultan.

Though Johor has been ruled over by at least 20 sultans, Sultan Abu Bakar who reigned from 1862 to 1895, was the first sultan of the current ruling family, the House of Temenggong. His father, Temenggong Daeng Ibrahim, managed to consolidate enough power to marginalize Sultan Ali who died in 1877.

Office-holder 
The office of sultan is currently held by  Sultan Ibrahim Ismail Ibni Almarhum Sultan Iskandar Al-Haj, who was proclaimed as the 23rd Sultan of Johor on 23 January 2010 and crowned on 23 March 2015 at the Istana Besar, Johor Bahru. His father, Sultan Iskandar Al-Haj ibni Almarhum Sultan Ismail Al-Khalidi, a great-grandson of Sultan Abu Bakar died on 22 January 2010; the death was announced that night. Ibrahim Ismail, the Tunku Mahkota of Johor (Crown Prince of Johor), was appointed as the Pemangku Raja (Regent) of Johor on the same day. The funeral was held on 23 January after the proclamation of Sultan Ibrahim Ismail.

List of office bearers

Timeline

Genealogy tree 
  <li class="lastline"> Dato Temenggong Sri Maharaja Tun Daeng Ibrahim l ibni al-Marhum Dato Temenggong Sri Maharaja Tun ‘Abdu’l Rahman, Maharaja of Johor     (8 December 1810 – 10 March 1855 – 31 January 1862, ancestor of the sultanal Temenggong Dynasty)
<li class="lastline"> Sultan Abu Bakar al-Khalil Ibrahim Shah ibni al-Marhum Dato’ Temenggong Sri Maharaja Tun Ibrahim (3 February 1833 – 31 January 1862 – 4 June 1895)
<li class="lastline"> Sultan Ibrahim al-Mashur ibni al-Marhum Sultan Abu Bakar (17 September 1873 – 4 June 1895 – 8 May 1959)
 Tunku Muhammad Khalid ibni Tunku Mahkota Ibrahim Iskandar
 <li class="lastline">  Sultan Ismail ibni al-Marhum Sultan Ibrahim (28 October 1894 – 8 May 1959 – 10 May 1981)
 Tunku 'Abdu'l Jalil ibni al-Marhum Sultan Ismail (11 May 1924 – 16 May 1925)
 Tunku 'Abdu'l Rahman ibni al-Marhum Sultan Ismail (29 July – 16 September 1930)
 <li class="lastline"> Paduka Sri Sultan Mahmud Iskandar Al-Haj ibni al-Marhum Sultan Ismail (8 April 1932 – 10 May 1981 – 22 January 2010) Enche’ Besar Hajjah Kalthom binti ‘Abdu’llah (b. in England, 2 December 1935 – 1 June 2018), née Josephine Ruby Trevorrow
 <li class="lastline"> Sultan  Ibrahim Ismail ibni al-Marhum Sultan Mahmud Iskandar al-Haj (Born 22 November 1958 – enthroned 23 January 2010 – )Raja Zarith Sofia binti al-Marhum Sultan Idris al-Mutawakil Allah Afifu’llah Shah, princess of Perak (14 August 1959 – )
 Tunku Ismail Idris ‘Abdu’l Majid Abu Bakar Iskandar ibni Sultan Ibrahim Ismail, Tunku Mahkota (Crown Prince, 30 June 1984 – )
 Tunku Iskandar Abdul Jalil Abu Bakar Ibrahim ibni Tunku Ismail, Raja Muda (14 October 2017 – )
 Tunku Abu Bakar Ibrahim ibni Tunku Ismail, (17 July 2019 – )
 Tunku Aminah Maimunah Iskandariah binti Sultan Ibrahim Ismail (8 April 1986 – )
 Tunku Idris Iskandar Ismail ‘Abdu’l Rahman ibni Sultan Ibrahim Ismail, Tunku Temenggong (25 December 1987 – )
 Tunku ‘Abdu’l Jalil Iskandar ibni Sultan Ibrahim Ismail, Tunku Laksamana (5 July 1990 – 5 December 2015)
 Tunku ‘Abdu’l Rahman Hassanal Jeffri ibni Sultan Ibrahim Ismail, Tunku Panglima (5 February 1993 – )
 <li class="lastline"> Tunku ‘Abu Bakar ibni Sultan Ibrahim Ismail, Tunku Putera (30 May 2001 – )

See also 
 Johor Sultanate
 Monarchies of Malaysia
 Family tree of Johor monarchs
 Family tree of Malaysian monarchs

References

Notes 

 Nesalamar Nadarajah, Johore and the Origins of British Control, 1895–1914, Arenabuku, 2000, 
 T. Wignesan, "A Peranakan's View of the fin de siècle monde malais – Na Tian Piet's Endearing syair of Epic Proportions" [partial tranls. with introduction and notes to Na Tian Piet's "Sha'er of the late Sultan Abu Bakar (of Johor)"]in The Gombak Review, Vol. 4,N° 2 (International Islamic University Malaysia), Kuala Lumpur, 1999, pp. 101–121.
 T. Wignesan. Sporadic Striving amid Echoed Voices, Mirrored Images and Stereotypic Posturing in Malaysian-Singaporean Literatures. Allahabad: Cyberwit.net, 2008, pp. 196–218. 

  
1528 establishments in Asia
Johor